Monica Olmi (born 6 August 1970) is an Italian former swimmer. She competed in four events at the 1984 Summer Olympics.

References

External links
 

1970 births
Living people
Italian female butterfly swimmers
Italian female freestyle swimmers
Olympic swimmers of Italy
Swimmers at the 1984 Summer Olympics
People from La Spezia
Sportspeople from the Province of La Spezia